The Scottish Parliament is the devolved, unicameral legislature of Scotland. Located in the Holyrood area of the capital city, Edinburgh, it is frequently referred to by the metonym Holyrood. The Parliament is a democratically elected body comprising 129 members known as Members of the Scottish Parliament (MSPs), elected for five-year terms under the additional member system: 73 MSPs represent individual geographical constituencies elected by the plurality (first-past-the-post) system, while a further 56 are returned as list members from eight additional member regions. Each region elects seven party-list MSPs. Each region elects 15 to 17 MSPs in total. The most recent general election to the Parliament was held on 6 May 2021, with the Scottish National Party winning a plurality.

The original Parliament of Scotland was the national legislature of the independent Kingdom of Scotland and existed from the early 13th century until the Kingdom of Scotland merged with the Kingdom of England under the Acts of Union 1707 to form the Kingdom of Great Britain. As a consequence, the Parliament of Scotland ceased to exist, while the Parliament of England, which sat at Westminster, was subsumed into the Parliament of Great Britain. In practice, all of the traditions, procedures, and standing orders of the English parliament were retained, with the addition of Scottish members in both the Commons and Lords.

Following a referendum in 1997, in which the Scottish electorate voted for devolution, the powers of the devolved legislature were specified by the Scotland Act 1998. The Act delineates the legislative competence of the Parliament – the areas in which it can make laws – by explicitly specifying powers that are "reserved" to the Parliament of the United Kingdom. The Scottish Parliament has the power to legislate in all areas that are not explicitly reserved to Westminster. The UK Parliament retains the ability to amend the terms of reference of the Scottish Parliament, and can extend or reduce the areas in which it can make laws. The first meeting of the new Parliament took place on 12 May 1999.

The legislative competence of the Scottish Parliament has been amended numerous times since then. The Scotland Act 2012 and Scotland Act 2016 expanded the Parliament's powers, especially over taxation and welfare. The United Kingdom Internal Market Act 2020 seeks to restrict the exercise of devolved competences both legally and practically. Its primary purpose is to constrain the capacity of the devolved institutions to use their regulatory autonomy by imposing requirements of market non-discrimination and mutual recognition. Its effect is to undermine the freedom of action, regulatory competence and authority of the Parliament, limiting its ability to make different economic or social choices to those made by Westminster.

History of the Scottish Parliament 

Before the Treaty of Union 1707 united the Kingdom of Scotland and the Kingdom of England into a new state called "Great Britain", Scotland had an independent parliament known as the Parliament of Scotland. Initial Scottish proposals in the negotiation over the Union suggested a devolved Parliament be retained in Scotland, but this was not accepted by the English negotiators.

For the next three hundred years, Scotland was directly governed by the Parliament of Great Britain and the subsequent Parliament of the United Kingdom, both seated at Westminster, and the lack of a Parliament of Scotland remained an important element in Scottish national identity. Suggestions for a 'devolved' Parliament were made before 1914, but were shelved due to the outbreak of the First World War. A sharp rise in nationalism in Scotland during the late 1960s fuelled demands for some form of home rule or complete independence, and in 1969 prompted the incumbent Labour government of Harold Wilson to set up the Kilbrandon Commission to consider the British constitution. One of the principal objectives of the commission was to examine ways of enabling more self-government for Scotland, within the unitary state of the United Kingdom. Kilbrandon published his report in 1973 recommending the establishment of a directly elected Scottish Assembly to legislate for the majority of domestic Scottish affairs.

During this time, the discovery of oil in the North Sea and the following "It's Scotland's oil" campaign of the Scottish National Party (SNP) resulted in rising support for Scottish independence, as well as the SNP. The party argued that the revenues from the oil were not benefitting Scotland as much as they should. The combined effect of these events led to Prime Minister Wilson committing his government to some form of devolved legislature in 1974. Under the terms of the Scotland Act 1978, an elected assembly would be set up in Edinburgh if the public approved it in a referendum be held on 1 March 1979. A narrow majority of 51.6% to 48.4% voted in favour of a Scottish Assembly, but the Act also required that at least 40% of the total electorate vote in favour of the proposal. As the turnout was only 63.6%, the vote in favour represented only 32.9% of the eligible voting population, and the Assembly was not established.

Throughout the 1980s and 1990s, demand for a Scottish Parliament grew, in part because the government of the United Kingdom was controlled by the Conservative Party, while Scotland itself elected relatively few Conservative MPs. In the aftermath of the 1979 referendum defeat, the Campaign for a Scottish Assembly was initiated as a pressure group, leading to the 1989 Scottish Constitutional Convention with various organisations such as Scottish churches, political parties and representatives of industry taking part. Publishing its blueprint for devolution in 1995, the Convention provided much of the basis for the structure of the Parliament.

Devolution continued to form part of the platform of the Labour Party which won power under Tony Blair in May 1997. In September 1997, the Scottish devolution referendum was put to the Scottish electorate and secured a majority in favour of the establishment of a new devolved Scottish Parliament, with tax-varying powers, in Edinburgh. An election was held on 6 May 1999, and on 1 July of that year power was transferred from Westminster to the new Parliament.

Building and grounds 

Since September 2004, the official home of the Scottish Parliament has been a new Scottish Parliament Building, in the Holyrood area of Edinburgh. The Scottish Parliament building was designed by Spanish architect Enric Miralles in partnership with local Edinburgh Architecture firm RMJM which was led by Design Principal Tony Kettle. Some of the principal features of the complex include leaf-shaped buildings, a grass-roofed branch merging into adjacent parkland and gabion walls formed from the stones of previous buildings. Throughout the building there are many repeated motifs, such as shapes based on Raeburn's Skating Minister. Crow-stepped gables and the upturned boat skylights of the Garden Lobby, complete the unique architecture. Queen Elizabeth II opened the new building on 9 October 2004.

Temporary accommodation 1999–2004 
While the permanent building at Holyrood was being constructed, a temporary home for the Parliament was found in Edinburgh. The General Assembly Hall of the Church of Scotland on the Royal Mile was chosen to host the Parliament. Official photographs and television interviews were held in the courtyard adjoining the Assembly Hall, which is part of the School of Divinity of the University of Edinburgh. This building was vacated twice to allow for the meeting of the Church's General Assembly. In May 2000, the Parliament was temporarily relocated to the former Strathclyde Regional Council debating chamber at Strathclyde House in Glasgow, and to the University of Aberdeen in May 2002.

Officials 

After each election to the Scottish Parliament, at the beginning of each parliamentary session, Parliament elects one MSP to serve as Presiding Officer, the equivalent of the speaker in other legislatures, and two MSPs to serve as deputies. The Presiding Officer (currently Alison Johnstone) and deputies (currently Annabelle Ewing and Liam McArthur) are elected by a secret ballot of the 129 MSPs, which is the only secret ballot conducted in the Scottish Parliament. Principally, the role of the Presiding Officer is to chair chamber proceedings and the Scottish Parliamentary Corporate Body. When chairing meetings of the Parliament, the Presiding Officer and his/her deputies must be politically impartial. During debates, the Presiding Officer (or the deputy) is assisted by the parliamentary clerks, who give advice on how to interpret the standing orders that govern the proceedings of meetings. A vote clerk sits in front of the Presiding Officer and operates the electronic voting equipment and chamber clocks.

As a member of the Scottish Parliamentary Corporate Body, the Presiding Officer is responsible for ensuring that the Parliament functions effectively and has the staff, property and resources it requires to operate. Convening the Parliamentary Bureau, which allocates time and sets the work agenda in the chamber, is another of the roles of the Presiding Officer. Under the Standing Orders of the Parliament the Bureau consists of the Presiding Officer and one representative from each political party with five or more seats in the Parliament. Amongst the duties of the Bureau are to agree the timetable of business in the chamber, establish the number, remit and membership of parliamentary committees and regulate the passage of legislation (bills) through the Parliament. The Presiding Officer also represents the Scottish Parliament at home and abroad in an official capacity.

The Presiding Officer controls debates by calling on members to speak. The Presiding Officer rules on points of order raised by members, which are not subject to debate or appeal. The Presiding Officer may also discipline members who fail to observe the rules of the Parliament.

Parliamentary chamber 

The debating chamber of the Scottish Parliament has seating arranged in a hemicycle, a design which is common across European legislatures, intended to encourage consensus and compromise. There are 131 seats in the debating chamber. Of the total 131 seats, 129 are occupied by the Parliament's elected MSPs and two are seats for the Scottish Law Officers—the Lord Advocate and the Solicitor General for Scotland, who are not elected members of the Parliament but are members of the Scottish Government. As such, the Law Officers may attend and speak in the plenary meetings of the Parliament but, as they are not elected MSPs, cannot vote.

Members are able to sit anywhere in the debating chamber, but typically sit in their party groupings. The First Minister, Scottish cabinet ministers and Law officers sit in the front row, in the middle section of the chamber. The largest party in the Parliament sits in the middle of the semicircle, with opposing parties on either side. The Presiding Officer, parliamentary clerks and officials sit opposite members at the front of the debating chamber.

In front of the Presiding Officers' desk is the parliamentary mace, which is made from silver and inlaid with gold panned from Scottish rivers and inscribed with the words: Wisdom, Compassion, Justice and Integrity. The words There shall be a Scottish Parliament, which are the first words of the Scotland Act, are inscribed around the head of the mace, which has a ceremonial role in the meetings of Parliament, representing the authority of the Parliament to make laws. Presented to the Scottish Parliament by the Queen upon Parliament's official opening in July 1999, the mace is displayed in a glass case, suspended from the lid. At the beginning of each sitting in the chamber, the lid of the case is rotated so that the mace is above the glass, to symbolise that a full meeting of the Parliament is taking place.

Proceedings 

Parliament typically sits Tuesdays, Wednesdays and Thursdays from early January to late June and from early September to mid December, with two-week recesses in April and October. Plenary meetings in the debating chamber usually take place on Wednesday afternoons from 2 pm to 6 pm and on Thursdays from 9:15 am to 6 pm. Chamber debates and committee meetings are open to the public. Entry is free, but booking in advance is recommended due to limited space. Parliament TV is a webcast and archive of Parliamentary business back to 2012. and on the BBC's parliamentary channel BBC Parliament. Proceedings are also recorded in text form, in print and online, in the Official Report, which is the substantially verbatim transcript of parliamentary debates.

Since September 2012, the first item of business on Tuesday afternoons is usually Time for Reflection at which a speaker addresses members for up to four minutes, sharing a perspective on issues of faith. This contrasts with the formal style of "Prayers", which is the first item of business in meetings of the House of Commons. Speakers are drawn from across Scotland and are chosen to represent the balance of religious beliefs according to the Scottish census. Invitations to address Parliament in this manner are determined by the Presiding Officer on the advice of the parliamentary bureau. Faith groups can make direct representations to the Presiding Officer to nominate speakers. Before September 2012, Time for reflection was held on Wednesday afternoons.

The Presiding Officer (or Deputy Presiding Officer) decides who speaks in chamber debates and the amount of time for which they are allowed to speak. Normally, the Presiding Officer tries to achieve a balance between different viewpoints and political parties when selecting members to speak. Typically, ministers or party leaders open debates, with opening speakers given between 5 and 20 minutes, and succeeding speakers allocated less time. The Presiding Officer can reduce speaking time if a large number of members wish to participate in the debate. Debate is more informal than in some parliamentary systems. Members may call each other directly by name, rather than by constituency or cabinet position, and hand clapping is allowed. Speeches to the chamber are normally delivered in English, but members may use Scots, Gaelic, or any other language with the agreement of the Presiding Officer. The Scottish Parliament has conducted debates in the Gaelic language.

Each sitting day, normally at 5 pm, MSPs decide on all the motions and amendments that have been moved that day. This "Decision Time" is heralded by the sounding of the division bell, which is heard throughout the Parliamentary campus and alerts MSPs who are not in the chamber to return and vote. At Decision Time, the Presiding Officer puts questions on the motions and amendments by reading out the name of the motion or amendment as well as the proposer and asking "Are we all agreed?", to which the chamber first votes orally. If there is audible dissent, the Presiding Officer announces "There will be a division" and members vote by means of electronic consoles on their desks. Each MSP has a unique access card with a microchip which, when inserted into the console, identifies them and allows them to vote. As a result, the outcome of each division is known in seconds.

The outcome of most votes can be predicted since political parties normally instruct members which way to vote. Parties entrust some MSPs, known as whips, with the task of ensuring that party members vote according to the party line. MSPs do not tend to vote against such instructions, since those who do are unlikely to reach higher political ranks in their parties. Errant members can be deselected as official party candidates during future elections, and, in serious cases, may be expelled from their parties outright. Thus, as with many Parliaments, the independence of Members of the Scottish Parliament tends to be low, and backbench rebellions by members who are discontent with their party's policies are rare. In some circumstances, however, parties announce "free votes", which allows Members to vote as they please. This is typically done on moral issues.

Immediately after Decision Time a "Members Debate" is held, which lasts for 45 minutes. Members Business is a debate on a motion proposed by an MSP who is not a Scottish minister. Such motions are on issues which may be of interest to a particular area such as a member's own constituency, an upcoming or past event or any other item which would otherwise not be accorded official parliamentary time. As well as the proposer, other members normally contribute to the debate. The relevant minister, whose department the debate and motion relate to "winds up" the debate by speaking after all other participants.

Committees 

Much of the work of the Scottish Parliament is done in committee. The role of committees is stronger in the Scottish Parliament than in other parliamentary systems, partly as a means of strengthening the role of backbenchers in their scrutiny of the government and partly to compensate for the fact that there is no revising chamber. The principal role of committees in the Scottish Parliament is to take evidence from witnesses, conduct inquiries and scrutinise legislation. Committee meetings take place on Tuesday, Wednesday and Thursday morning when Parliament is sitting. Committees can also meet at other locations throughout Scotland.

Committees comprise a small number of MSPs, with membership reflecting the balance of parties across Parliament. There are different committees with their functions set out in different ways. Mandatory Committees are committees which are set down under the Scottish Parliament's standing orders, which govern their remits and proceedings. The current Mandatory Committees in the fourth Session of the Scottish Parliament are: Public Audit; Equal Opportunities; European and External Relations; Finance; Public Petitions; Standards, Procedures and Public Appointments; and Delegated Powers and Law Reform.

Subject Committees are established at the beginning of each parliamentary session, and again the members on each committee reflect the balance of parties across Parliament. Typically each committee corresponds with one (or more) of the departments (or ministries) of the Scottish Government. The current Subject Committees in the fourth Session are: Economy, Energy and Tourism; Education and Culture; Health and Sport; Justice; Local Government and Regeneration; Rural Affairs, Climate Change and Environment; Welfare Reform; and Infrastructure and Capital Investment.

A further type of committee is normally set up to scrutinise private bills submitted to the Scottish Parliament by an outside party or promoter who is not a member of the Scottish Parliament or Scottish Government. Private bills normally relate to large-scale development projects such as infrastructure projects that require the use of land or property. Private Bill Committees have been set up to consider legislation on issues such as the development of the Edinburgh Tram Network, the Glasgow Airport Rail Link, the Airdrie–Bathgate rail link and extensions to the National Gallery of Scotland.

Legislative functions and powers 

The Scotland Act 1998, which was passed by the Parliament of the United Kingdom and given royal assent by Queen Elizabeth II on 19 November 1998, governs the functions and role of the Scottish Parliament and delimits its legislative competence. Since the establishment of the Parliament, there have been a number of changes to its legislative competence.

The Parliament is able to debate any issue (including those reserved to Westminster) but is unable to make laws on issues that are outside its legislative competence. As the Scottish Parliament is able to make laws on the areas constitutionally devolved to it, the legislative process begins with bills (draft laws) which are presented to Parliament. Bills can be introduced to Parliament in a number of ways; the Scottish Government can introduce new laws or amendments to existing laws as a bill; a committee of the Parliament can present a bill in one of the areas under its remit; a member of the Scottish Parliament can introduce a bill as a private member; or a private bill can be submitted to Parliament by an outside proposer. Most draft laws are government bills introduced by ministers in the governing party (or parties). Bills pass through Parliament in a number of stages before receiving royal assent, whereupon they become Acts of the Scottish Parliament.

The Scotland Act 2012 and the Scotland Act 2016 extended the devolved competencies, including the introduction of taxation powers. The United Kingdom Internal Market Act 2020 seeks to restrict the operation of devolved powers. The latter legislation, passed under the government of Boris Johnson, gives UK ministers extended powers to enforce mutual recognition of regulations across the UK, and the exemptions permitted for the devolved administrations are significantly less extensive than previous exemptions under the EU Single Market rules. On paper, it does not particularly change devolved competences, but it both legally and practically restrains the legislative competence of the Parliament. The business secretary tacitly acknowledged this fact in the impact assessment that the BEIS department was obliged to publish alongside the bill, which states: "The final cost of this legislation is the potentially reduced ability for different parts of the UK to achieve local policy benefits. While this legislation does not constrain the ability of different parts of the UK to introduce distinct policies, to the extent that those policies may be enforceable on a reduced number of businesses might make it harder to realise fully the benefits of those policies." Although the UK Government stated on publication that the proposed bill sought to "protect the integrity of the UK's single market", the legislation has been heavily criticised for its dealings with the devolved nations. First Minister Nicola Sturgeon called the bill a "full frontal assault on devolution". The legislation undermines the freedom of action, regulatory competence and authority of the Parliament, limiting its ability to make different economic or social choices from those made in Westminster, and to focus and plan investment in infrastructure in Scotland.

Under the terms of the Scotland Acts, the Parliament of the United Kingdom agreed to devolve some of its responsibilities over Scottish domestic policy to the Scottish Parliament. The Scotland Act 1998 enabled the Scottish Parliament to pass primary legislation on these issues, and to hold the Scottish Government to account. Although the Westminster Parliament retains the authority to legislate on devolved matters, under the Sewell convention it is understood that it will not do so without the consent of the Scottish Parliament.

Powers of the Scottish Parliament
All matters that are not specifically stated in Schedule 5 to the Scotland Act as reserved matters are automatically devolved to the Scottish Parliament. The Scottish Parliament has powers over areas such as:

 agriculture, fisheries, animal welfare, and forestry
 environment, land registration and use
 food safety and food standards
 consumer advocacy and advice
 water and sanitation
 the Crown Estate
 economic development and inward investment
 income tax on non-savings and non-dividend income
 issue of Scottish Government bonds to finance capital investment
 Council Tax, Business rates, Air Departure Tax, Land and Buildings Transaction Tax and Scottish Landfill Tax
 education (early, primary, secondary and tertiary) and training
 Scots language and Gaelic language
 health and social care
 legal system, human rights and legal aid
 civil and criminal law
 courts and tribunals
 legal profession
 police and fire and rescue services
 prisons and parole
 air guns 
 alcohol licensing
 civil registration, census, demography, statistics, national archives
 planning permission
 local government
 culture, sport, the arts, heritage and tourism
 parking controls, bus policy, concessionary fares, cycling, taxis and minicabs
 railway services, franchising, and construction of new railways
 road network, trunk road management, road signs and speed limits
 shipping, ports, inland waterways, harbours and ferries
 housing, homelessness and building standards
 charities
 onshore petroleum
 heating and cooling
 bank holidays
 welfare foods for pregnant women, mothers and children
 devolved social security benefits

Reserved powers
Reserved matters are subjects that are outside the legislative competence of the Scottish Parliament and are reserved to the United Kingdom Parliament. These include:

 the constitution
 foreign affairs
 broadcasting
 civil service
 defence
 treason
 fiscal, economic and monetary policy, currency, government borrowing and lending, the exchange rate and the Bank of England
 inheritance tax, value-added tax, excise duties, motoring taxation, corporation tax
 National Insurance, capital gains tax, income tax on savings and dividend income
 pensions
 financial services and markets
 drug policy
 data protection
 firearms
 immigration and nationality
 national security
 betting, gaming and lotteries
 competition, intellectual property, import and export control, consumer protection
 product standards, weights and measures
 telecommunications
 post
 common markets for UK goods and services
 electricity, coal, oil, gas, nuclear energy
 employment and industrial relations, health and safety
 most aspects of transport safety and regulation
 Working Tax Credit, Jobseeker's Allowance, Income Support, Child Benefit, Child tax credit, Housing Benefit, Universal Credit.

Scrutiny of government 

The party, or parties, that hold the majority of seats in the Parliament forms the Scottish Government. In contrast to many other parliamentary systems, Parliament elects a First Minister from a number of candidates at the beginning of each parliamentary term (after a general election). Any member can put their name forward to be First Minister, and a vote is taken by all members of Parliament. Normally, the leader of the largest party is returned as First Minister, and head of the Scottish Government. Theoretically, Parliament also elects the Scottish Ministers who form the government of Scotland and sit in the Scottish cabinet, but such ministers are, in practice, appointed to their roles by the First Minister. Junior ministers, who do not attend cabinet, are also appointed to assist Scottish ministers in their departments. Most ministers and their juniors are drawn from amongst the elected MSPs, with the exception of Scotland's Chief Law Officers: the Lord Advocate and the Solicitor General. Whilst the First Minister chooses the ministers – and may decide to remove them at any time – the formal appointment or dismissal is made by the Sovereign.

Under the Scotland Act 1998, ordinary general elections for the Scottish Parliament are held on the first Thursday in May every four years (1999, 2003, 2007 and so on). The date of the poll may be varied by up to one month either way by the Monarch on the proposal of the Presiding Officer. If the Parliament itself resolves that it should be dissolved (with at least two-thirds of the Members voting in favour), or if the Parliament fails to nominate one of its members to be First Minister within 28 days of a General Election or of the position becoming vacant, the Presiding Officer proposes a date for an extraordinary general election and the Parliament is dissolved by the Monarch by royal proclamation. Extraordinary general elections are in addition to ordinary general elections, unless held less than six months before the due date of an ordinary general election, in which case they supplant it. The following ordinary election reverts to the first Thursday in May, a multiple of four years after 1999 (i.e., 5 May 2011, 7 May 2015, etc.).

Several procedures enable the Scottish Parliament to scrutinise the Government. The First Minister or members of the cabinet can deliver statements to Parliament upon which MSPs are invited to question. For example, at the beginning of each parliamentary year, the First Minister delivers a statement to the chamber setting out the Government's legislative programme for the forthcoming year. After the statement has been delivered, the leaders of the opposition parties and other MSPs question the First Minister on issues related to the substance of the statement.

Parliamentary time is also set aside for question periods in the debating chamber. A "General Question Time" takes place on a Thursday between 11:40 a.m. and noon where members can direct questions to any member of the Scottish Government. At 2:30 pm, a 40-minute-long themed "Question Time" takes place, where members can ask questions of ministers in departments that are selected for questioning that sitting day, such as health and justice or education and transport. Between noon and 12:30 p.m. on Thursdays, when Parliament is sitting, First Minister's Question Time takes place. This gives members an opportunity to question the First Minister directly on issues under their jurisdiction.

Members who wish to ask general or themed questions, or questions of the First Minister, must lodge them with parliamentary clerks beforehand and selections are made by the Presiding Officer. Written questions may also be submitted by members to ministers. Written questions and answers are published in the Official Report.

Parliamentary scrutiny in COVID-19
The first session of Leaders’ Virtual Question Time, or virtual First Minister's Questions, was held on 9 April 2020 during the COVID-19 pandemic.

Members, constituencies and voting systems 

Elections for the Scottish Parliament were amongst the first in Britain to use a Mixed-member proportional representation (MMP) system. The system is a form of the additional member method (AMS) of proportional representation, and is better known as such in Britain. Under the system, voters are given two votes: one for a specific candidate and one for a political party.

Of the 129 MSPs, 73 are elected to represent first past the post constituencies and are known as "Constituency MSPs". Voters choose one member to represent the constituency, and the member with most votes is returned as a constituency MSP. The 73 Scottish Parliament constituencies shared the same boundaries as the UK Parliament constituencies in Scotland, prior to the 2005 reduction in the number of Scottish  MPs, with the exception of Orkney and Shetland which each return their own constituency MSP. Currently, the average Scottish Parliament constituency comprises 55,000 electors. Given the geographical distribution of population in Scotland, this results in constituencies of a smaller area in the Central Lowlands, where the bulk of Scotland's population live, and much larger constituency areas in the north and west of the country, which have a low population density. The island archipelagos of Orkney, Shetland and the Western Isles comprise a much smaller number of electors, due to their dispersed population. If a constituency MSP resigns from Parliament, this triggers a by-election in his or her constituency, where a replacement MSP is returned by the plurality system.

The remaining 56 MSPs, called "List MSPs", are elected by an additional members system, which seeks to make the overall results more proportional, countering any distortions in the constituency results. Seven list MSPs are elected from each of eight electoral regions, of which constituencies are sub-divisions:
 Central Scotland
 Glasgow
 Highlands and Islands
 Lothian
 Mid Scotland and Fife
 North East Scotland
 South Scotland
 West Scotland
Each political party draws up a list of candidates standing in each electoral region, from which the list MSPs are elected. Independents can also stand in regions, in which case they are treated as a one-person "list". Candidates can stand for both a constituency and a list; should they be elected for a constituency, this takes precedence and they are skipped over when apportioning seats from their party list. If a list MSP later leaves the Parliament, the next person on the resigning MSPs' party's list takes the seat. Should a list MSP leave their party, however, they retain their seat and are not replaced. If an independent list MSP leaves the Parliament, they are not replaced and the seat is left vacant until the next general election.

The total number of seats in the Parliament is allocated to parties proportionally to the number of votes received in the second vote of the ballot using the d'Hondt method. For example, to determine who is awarded the first list seat, the number of list votes cast for each party is divided by one plus the number of seats the party won in the region (at this point just constituency seats). The party with the highest quotient is awarded the seat, which is then added to its constituency seats in allocating the second seat. This is repeated iteratively until all available list seats are allocated. As the allocation of seats to parties mirrors the popular vote, it is commonplace for the most successful party in the election not to win an outright majority of the seats, thereby requiring them to  seek some form and level of cross-party support for their initiatives in government. Nonetheless, the 2011 election saw the SNP become the first–and to date, only–party to win a majority government.

As in the House of Commons, a number of qualifications apply to being an MSP. Such qualifications were introduced under the House of Commons Disqualification Act 1975 and the British Nationality Act 1981. Specifically, members must be over the age of 18 and must be a citizen of the United Kingdom, the Republic of Ireland, one of the countries in the Commonwealth of Nations, a citizen of a British overseas territory, or a European Union citizen resident in the UK. Members of the police and the armed forces are disqualified from sitting in the Scottish Parliament as elected MSPs, and similarly, civil servants and members of foreign legislatures are disqualified. An individual may not sit in the Scottish Parliament if he or she is judged to be insane under the terms of the Mental Health (Care and Treatment) (Scotland) Act 2003. There is no legal prohibition on holding a dual mandate, sitting in both the Scottish Parliament and the House of Commons. However, while several members of the original Scottish Parliament held seats at Westminster, it is now rare; since 2011, only one MSP has served concurrently as an MP for a significant period of time.

Elections 

Elections for the Scottish Parliament are for all 129 seats using the Additional Member System. There have been six elections to the Parliament, in 1999, 2003, 2007, 2011, 2016 and 2021.

The latest Scottish Parliament election was held on Thursday 6 May 2021. Under the Scotland Act 1998, an ordinary general election to the Scottish Parliament would normally have been held on the first Thursday in May four years after the 2016 election, i.e. in May 2020. This would have coincided with the proposed date of the next United Kingdom general election until an early UK election was called in 2017. In November 2015, the Scottish Government published a Scottish Elections (Dates) Bill, which proposed to extend the term of the Parliament to five years. That Bill was passed by the Scottish Parliament on 25 February 2016 and received Royal Assent on 30 March 2016, setting the new date for the election as 6 May 2021.

Citizens of the UK, Ireland, EU member states and other countries who have permission to enter or remain in the UK (or who do not need such permission), and are resident in Scotland, are entitled to vote. The minimum voting age is 16. This differs from elections to the Westminster parliament, which are restricted to citizens of the UK, Ireland and qualifying Commonwealth citizens, with a minimum voting age of 18. Citizens of other non-Commonwealth EU member states who are resident in Scotland have been entitled to vote in elections to the Scottish Parliament since 1999. Since this date, the franchise has been further extended, with a two-thirds majority being required to make changes to the franchise under the Scotland Act 2016. From the 2016 election, the franchise for Scottish Parliament elections was expanded to include 16- and 17-year-olds. In 2020, the Scottish Parliament voted to extend the right to vote in Scotland to all foreign nationals with leave to remain (limited or indefinite).

Criticism 

The resignation of Henry McLeish as First Minister, brought on by an office expenses scandal, generated controversy in the first years of the Scottish Parliament. Various academics have written on how the Scottish Parliament can be improved as a governing institution.

West Lothian question 

As a consequence of the establishment of the Scottish Parliament, Scottish MPs sitting in the UK House of Commons are able to vote on domestic legislation that applies only to England, Wales, and Northern Ireland – whilst English, Scottish, Welsh and Northern Irish Westminster MPs are unable to vote on the domestic legislation of the Scottish Parliament. This phenomenon is known as the West Lothian question and has led to criticism. Following the Conservative victory in the 2015 UK election, standing orders of the House of Commons were changed to give MPs representing English constituencies a new "veto" over laws only affecting England, known as English votes for English laws. The mechanism was abolished in 2021.

Abolition 
Parties such as the Abolish the Scottish Parliament Party, the UK Independence Party (UKIP), and Scottish Unionist Party (SUP) have advocated for abolishing the Scottish Parliament.

Notes

References

Bibliography 
 Balfour, A. & McCrone, G. (2005): Creating a Scottish Parliament, StudioLR, 
 Burrows, N. (1999): "Unfinished Business – The Scotland Act 1998", Modern Law Review, Vol. 62, No. 2 (March 1999), pp. 241–260
 Dardanelli, P. (2005): Between Two Unions: Europeanisation and Scottish Devolution, Manchester University Press, 
 Hassan, Gerry (1999): A Guide to the Scottish Parliament: The Shape of Things to Come, The Stationery Office", 
 Hassan, Gerry (2019): The Story of the Scottish Parliament: The First Two Decades Explained, Edinburgh University Press, 
 Kingdom, J. (1999): Government and Politics in Britain, An Introduction, Polity, 
 MacLean, B. (2005): Getting It Together: Scottish Parliament, Luath Press Ltd, 
 McFadden, J. & Lazarowicz, M. (2003): The Scottish Parliament: An Introduction, LexisNexis UK, 
 Murkens, E.; Jones, P. & Keating, M. (2002): Scottish Independence: A Practical Guide, Edinburgh University Press, 
 Taylor, Brian (1999): The Scottish Parliament, Polygon, Edinburgh, 
 Taylor, Brian (2002): The Scottish Parliament: The Road to Devolution, Edinburgh University Press, 
 Young, John R. (1996): The Scottish Parliament, 1639–1661: A Political and Constitutional, Edinburgh: John Donald Publishers

External links 
 
 Scottish Parliament TV

 
Parliament
Scotland
Scotland
1999 establishments in Scotland
Scottish devolution